In computer science, a mobile agent is a composition of computer software and data that is able to migrate (move) from one computer to another autonomously and continue its execution on the destination computer. In reality, the mobile agent is the code/object on the move which travels in its itinerary within the network of connected nodes.

Definition and overview

A mobile agent is a type of software agent, with the feature of  autonomy, social ability, learning, and most significantly, mobility.

More specifically, a mobile agent is a process that can transport its state from one environment to another, with its data intact, and be capable of performing appropriately in the new environment. Mobile agents decide when and where to move.  Movement is often evolved from RPC methods.  Just as a user directs an Internet browser to "visit" a website (the browser merely downloads a copy of the site, or one version of it in the case of dynamic web sites), a mobile agent accomplishes a move through data duplication. When a mobile agent decides to move, it saves its own state (process image), transports this saved state to the new host and resumes execution from the saved state.

A mobile agent is a specific form of mobile code, within the field of code mobility. However, in contrast to the remote evaluation and code on demand programming paradigms, mobile agents are active in that they can choose to migrate between computers at any time during their execution. This makes them a powerful tool for implementing distributed applications in a computer network.

There are two types of mobile agents. The classification is based on their migration path.

 Mobile agents with predefined path: these have a static migration path.
 Free roaming mobile agent: these have a dynamic migration path. Depending on the present network condition, the mobile agent chooses its path.

An open multi-agent system (MAS) is a system in which agents, that are owned by a variety of stakeholders, continuously enter and leave the system.

History and Evolution

In the early 1990s, General Magic created the Telescript language and environment for writing and executing mobile agents, and described it with the now-popular "cloud" metaphor; as described by Andy Hertzfeld:

The company was unsuccessful, however.

Advantages
Some advantages which mobile agents have over conventional agents are:
 Computation bundles - converts computational client/server round trips to relocatable data bundles, reducing network load.
 Parallel processing -asynchronous execution on multiple heterogeneous network hosts
 Dynamic adaptation - actions are dependent on the state of the host environment
 Tolerant to network faults - able to operate without an active connection between client and server
 Flexible maintenance - to change an agent's actions, only the source (rather than the computation hosts) must be updated
Bandwidth conversion which is conversion the bandwidth one host to another host. 
Reduces compilation time.
One particular advantage for remote deployment of software includes increased portability thereby making system requirements less influential.

See also
Code mobility
Java Aglets
JADE
Fraglets

References

External links
Seven Good Reasons for Mobile Agents
Mobile Agent Technologies, developer of AgentOS agent-based operating system. The inventor of Automatic Thread Migration (ATM).
National Institute for Standards and Technology, hosts a center for investigating the security of mobile agents.
AgentLink III
Mobile-C, a multi-agent platform for mobile C/C++ agents.
JADE, an OSS mobile agent framework written in JAVA.
The Foundation for Intelligent Physical Agents, a standards body that defines an interface for agent-based interactions.
Secure Mobile Agents Project, a project to develop a secure mobile agent server (last release 2007).
AgentLink III

Distributed computing architecture

fr:Agent mobile